Penicillium alfredii is a fungus species of the genus of Penicillium which is named after Alfred P. Sloan.

See also
List of Penicillium species

References

alfredii
Fungi described in 2014